Edwin Heister Guie (September 26, 1867 – October 28, 1931) was an American politician in the state of Washington. He served in the Washington House of Representatives. He served as Speaker from 1899 to 1901 and from 1921 to 1923.

References

Republican Party members of the Washington House of Representatives
1867 births
1931 deaths